The Pļaviņas Hydroelectric Power Station has the largest hydroelectric power plant in the Baltics and one of the biggest in the European Union.  It is located in Aizkraukle on the Daugava River. It has ten individual water turbines with an installed total capacity of 894 MW.

The  construction aroused an unusual wave of protest in 1958. Most Latvians opposed the flooding of historical sites and a particularly scenic gorge with rare plants and natural features, such as the Staburags. The construction of the dam was endorsed in 1959, however, after the purge of relatively liberal and nationally oriented leaders under Eduards Berklavs and their replacement by Moscow-oriented, ideologically conservative cadres led by Arvīds Pelše.

The plant was put into full operation in 1968.  In 1991–2001, six additional turbines were added to the original four, thus increasing the capacity to 868.5MW. Reconstruction and overhaul of the units between 2007 and 2010 increased both the efficiency of the plant and its power output.

The complex is operated by Latvenergo.

References

External links

Hydroelectric power stations in Latvia
Hydroelectric power stations built in the Soviet Union
Dams in Latvia
Dams completed in 1965
Aizkraukle